The Pescadero Basin is a submarine depression located on the seabed at the southern end of the Gulf of California  off the coast of the Mexican state of Sinaloa. The basin results from the activity of one of the several spreading centers in the Gulf. The basin is linked to the Pescadero Fault to the south, and the Atl Fault in the north, two of the transform faults of the Gulf of California Rift Zone, i. e. the northern extension of the eastern Pacific Ridge.

Studies released around 2015 have revealed that the Pescadero Basin is a hydrothermal field rich in particular in carbonate chimneys, the only ones so far discovered in the Pacific Ocean, and thus in the typical living species that inhabit these environments.

References

 Continent-Ocean Transition Across the Alarcon Basin, Gulf of California from Seismic Reflection and Refraction Data, Sutherland et al (2003)

Depressions of Mexico
Geology of Mexico
Plate tectonics